Northumberland County is a county located in the Commonwealth of Virginia. At the 2020 census, the population was 11,839. Its county seat is Heathsville. The county is located on the Northern Neck and is part of the Northern Neck George Washington Birthplace AVA winemaking appellation.

History
The area was occupied at the time of English settlement by the Algonquian-speaking historic tribes of the Wicocomico, Chickacoan, and Patawomeck. The county was created by the Virginia General Assembly in 1648 during a period of rapid population growth and geographic expansion. Settlement began in this area of the Northern Neck around 1635. Originally known as the Indian district Chickacoan, the area was first referred to as Northumberland (a namesake of Northumberland County, England) in the colonial records in 1644. The following year, John Mottrom served as the first burgess for the territory in the House of Burgesses, which met at the capital of the Virginia Colony at Jamestown.  The county was formed from a part of York County.

The colonial court ordered the Wicocomico and Chickacoan tribes to merge and by 1655, assigned them a reservation of  near Dividing Creek, south of the Great Wicomico River. The Patawomeck Tribe was hunted nearly to extinction in 1666, and survived only by intermarriage. By the early 1700s, the Wicocomico tribe was greatly reduced, and English colonists took control of their lands. They were believed to be extinct as a tribe as, landless, they disappeared from the historical record. Descendants of the last weroance are working to regain recognition as a tribe, the Wicocomico Indian Nation. Descendants of the Patawomeck achieved tribal recognition from the state of Virginia in February 2010.
The size of the county was drastically reduced in 1651 and 1653 when the colonial government organized Lancaster and Westmoreland counties from it.

Of the 172 counties, that have ever existed in Virginia's history, Northumberland ended up being an "ancestor" to 116 of these—more than the current 95 counties (several were lost to other states, such as West Virginia).

Geography
The county is located between the Rappahannock River to the south and Potomac River to the north. Chesapeake Bay is immediately east of the county.

Adjacent counties
 Lancaster County – south
 Richmond County – west
 Westmoreland County – northwest
 St. Mary's County, Maryland – north

Demographics

2020 census

Note: the US Census treats Hispanic/Latino as an ethnic category. This table excludes Latinos from the racial categories and assigns them to a separate category. Hispanics/Latinos can be of any race.

2000 Census
As of the census of 2000, there were 12,259 people, 5,470 households, and 3,785 families residing in the county. The population density was 64 people per square mile (25/km2). There were 8,057 housing units at an average density of 42 per square mile (16/km2). The racial makeup of the county was 72.18% White, 26.58% Black or African American, 0.15% Native American, 0.20% Asian, 0.33% from other races, and 0.56% from two or more races. 0.93% of the population were Hispanic or Latino of any race.

There were 5,470 households, out of which 20.11% had children under the age of 18 living with them, 57.30% were married couples living together, 8.70% had a female householder with no husband present, and 30.80% were non-families. 27.70% of all households were made up of individuals, and 15.20% had someone living alone who was 65 years of age or older. The average household size was 2.24 and the average family size was 2.70.

In the county, the population was spread out, with 18.60% under the age of 18, 4.80% from 18 to 24, 20.20% from 25 to 44, 30.10% from 45 to 64, and 26.20% who were 65 years of age or older. The median age was 50 years. For every 100 females, there were 91.20 males. For every 100 females age 18 and over, there were 88.40 males.

The median income for a household in the county was $38,129, and the median income for a family was $49,047. Males had a median income of $30,151 versus $24,116 for females. The per capita income for the county was $22,917. 12.30% of the population and 8.10% of families were below the poverty line. Out of the total people living in poverty, 17.00% are under the age of 18 and 10.70% are 65 or older.

Government
Supervisors of Northumberland county are:

 James W. Brann (District 1)
 Richard F. Haynie (District 2, Chair)
 James M. Long (District 3)
 Thomas H. Tomlin (District 4)
 Ronald L. Jett (District 5, Vice Chair)

The County Administrator is Luttrell Tadlock.

Emergency Services 
There is no police department in the county. Instead, law enforcement is the responsibility of the county Sheriff, a commonwealth constitutional officer elected every four years, with support from the Virginia State Police. The Northumberland County Sheriff's Office is located in Heathsville. The current Sheriff is John A. “Johnny” Beauchamp

Northumberland County has two courthouses: an antebellum building and a new building constructed in the late 1990s behind the older structure. The county courts (Circuit Court, General District Court, and Juvenile and Domestic Relations District Court), along with the Clerk of the Circuit Court and the Commonwealth's Attorney, both commonwealth constitutional officers, are located in the new building. The Commissioner of Revenue and the County Treasurer, both commonwealth constitutional officers, have offices in the older building.

The county is served by two fire departments, Callao Volunteer Fire Department in Callao and Fairfield Volunteer Fire Department with buildings in Reedville and Burgess. There are four rescue squads that serve the county: Northumberland Emergency Services, Callao Volunteer Rescue Squad in Callao, Mid-County Volunteer Rescue Squad in Heathsville, and Northumberland County Rescue Squad in Reedville and Burgess. The county also has a water rescue service, Smith Point Sea Rescue.

Education 
Northumberland County Public Schools instructs about 1200 students in the county. Northumberland Elementary, Middle, and High School all share the same campus. The Middle and High school students share the High School building while the Elementary students have their own dedicated building on campus. The Superintendent is Dr. Holly Wargo.

Politics

Reedville, menhaden fishing industry
Reedville is a small village in eastern Northumberland County on the western shore of the Chesapeake Bay. Reedville is home to the Atlantic menhaden fishing industry. It is named for Captain Elijah W. Reed (1827-1888), who is credited with bringing the menhaden fishing industry, and the tremendous wealth that resulted from it, to Reedville—and to Northumberland County in general.

Dozens of fish-processing factories, most recently Omega Protein Corporation (successor to Zapata Haynie, Reedville Oil and Guano Company and Haynie Products Company) and Standard Products Company, have dotted the Northumberland coastline near Reedville and adjacent fishing communities.

Today, Omega Protein remains the largest industrial organization in the area. Omega, with a fleet of large oceangoing fish-harvesting vessels, supported by a number of spotter aircraft, is a major industry in the area and on the Eastern seaboard. Menhaden, once caught, are cooked in large mass and processed for further use in various applications, including as a protein additive for poultry feed.

Located at the eastern terminus of U.S. Route 360, Reedville is a popular place to begin fishing charters and trips to Tangier Island in the Bay. Reedville is also a tourist destination itself, steeped in the history of the menhaden fishing industry. The Millionaire's Row of Victorian Era mansions and several watercraft of the Fishermen's Museum are listed on the National Register of Historic Places.

Communities

Town
 Kilmarnock in Lancaster County extends into southeastern Northumberland County.

Census-designated place
 Heathsville

Other unincorporated communities

 Avalon
 Beverlyville
 Browns Store
 Bryant Corner
 Burgess
 Callao
 Coan
 Cowart
 Fairport
 Fleeton
 Lake
 Lottsburg
 Reedville
 Wicomico Church

See also
 National Register of Historic Places listings in Northumberland County, Virginia

References

External links

 County website

 
Virginia counties
1648 establishments in Virginia
Virginia counties on the Potomac River
Northern Neck
Populated places established in 1648
Virginia counties on the Chesapeake Bay